Air Commodore Steven Abbott  (born 5 February 1956) is a former senior officer in the Royal Air Force.

He was educated at the University of East Anglia (BA) and Downing College, Cambridge (MPhil), and the University of Manchester. He was Commandant-General of the RAF Regiment from 2007 until February 2010, simultaneously holding the post of Air Officer of the RAF Police.

He was a long-serving member of the RAF 'Cresta' Association, competing for the final time (on his penultimate day of RAF service) in 2011.

He is a member of Chatham House and was awarded the Queen's Commendation for Valuable Service in 2000. He is a governor of Culford School.

References

1956 births
Living people
Alumni of the University of East Anglia
Alumni of Downing College, Cambridge
Commanders of the Order of the British Empire
Recipients of the Commendation for Valuable Service
Royal Air Force Regiment officers
Chatham House people